The 1988 World Field Archery Championships were held in Bolzano, Italy.

Medal summary (Men's individual)

Medal summary (Women's individual)

Medal summary (Mixed team)

Medal summary (Junior's individual)

References

E
1988 in Italian sport
International archery competitions hosted by Italy
World Field Archery Championships